Nowlands Gap, also known as Nowlands Pass and Murrurundi Gap, is a pass over the Liverpool Range, part of the Great Dividing Range, that provides access between the Northern Tablelands and Hunter regions of New South Wales, Australia.

Location and features
William Nowland, a farmer from Singleton (then known as Patrick's Plains), discovered Nowlands Gap north of Murrurundi in 1827. The New England Highway carries vehicular traffic over the range, and the Main North railway line passes under the range via the Ardglen Tunnel.

The Bureau of Meteorology maintains a weather station at the pass, named Murrurundi Gap AWS.

Climate

See also

List of mountain passes

References

External links
 Murrurundi - The Sydney Morning Herald

Northern Tablelands
Mountain passes of Australia
Hunter Region
Great Dividing Range